.577 may refer to:

 .577 Black Powder Express, a black powder, centerfire round
 .577 Nitro Express, a rimmed metallic cartridge
 .577 Tyrannosaur, a type of cartridge developed by A-Square in 1993 for big game hunting in Africa
 .577/450 Martini-Henry, a black powder, centerfire round used by the British and British Empire militaries
 .577 Snider, an obsolete cartridge produced around 1867 and replaced in service by the .577/450 Martini–Henry cartridge
 The first three digits in the decimal expansion of the Euler–Mascheroni constant, .57721 56649...